Chief (Mrs.) Josephine Elechi, wife of the Former Governor of Ebonyi State.

Early life, education and personal life

Elechi attended Covenant Primary School in Afikpo from 1954–1961. She then moved to Holy Child Secondary School in Sharon from 1962–1966. Elechi took a break from school to work at Nigeria Construction and Furniture Company from 1973–1975. Finally, she attended Enugu State University of Technology (ESUT) from 1993-2000 earning a Bachelor of Science (B.Sc.) degree. After obtaining her degree, she continued to work until her marriage.

Elechi is married to Chief Martin Elechi and has four children, three boys and one girl. Elechi is a member of the Izzi ethnic group.

Political career
Since 2004, she has served on the Ebonyi State Committee on Tsunami Disaster.

When her husband, Martin Elechi became governor on May 29, 2007 she became more involved in political life, becoming the Chair of the Ebonyi State Women Development Commission (WDC) in 2007, and Chair of the Mother and Child Care Initiative (MCCI), also in 2007.

The Mother and Child Care Initiative (MCCI) used public and private partner sponsorship to address issues for the benefit of Ebonyi women and children.

Mother and Child Care Initiative
The thematic areas of the MCCI Program include:
Reduction of the unacceptably high maternal/neonatal mortality
Reduction of maternal morbidities like obstetric fistula
Early detection of breast and cervical cancer
Girl-child education
Youth/Women empowerment
HIV/AIDS
Orphan and vulnerable children (OVCs)

The overall goal is to promote the survival of Ebonyi women and children. Action commenced in August 2007 with the drafting of a "road map". The work plan for 2008-2009 was synthesized out of this document.

Many activities have been carried out since 2008 in the areas of promotion of maternal mortality, cancer and gender-based violence including:
Advocacy visits, interactive forums and meetings to create awareness about MCCI and its projects, and obtain support. The target audience included:
The Federal Ministry of Health
UNFPA
UNICEF
USAID
Ebonyi State Executive Council Members
Ebonyi State Legislators
Chairmen of LGAs and Coordinators of Development Centers
Corporate Organizations
Financial Institutions
The Media
Various Ministries in the State
The State Planning Commission
A technical committee of three (3) persons from the ministries of Health, Education, Agriculture, Youth and Sports, Women Affairs and Social Development was inaugurated to collaborate between MCCI and their ministries so as to strengthen and increase inter-sectoral collaboration and partnership.
To aid effective evaluation of the MCCI Program, a baseline survey was conducted to obtain data for subsequent evaluation of the Program. To ensure accuracy of data collected, a 2-day baseline survey workshop to train field workers was organized for staff of the health and education departments in the 13 LGAs and for staff of the line ministries. The MCCI monitoring team supervised and monitored the data collection. The data was processed, analyzed and sent to the line ministries to assist in their policy formulation.
A 3-day Safe Motherhood Workshop was organized for all stakeholders including EXCO members, Legislators; the Judiciary, Local Government Chairmen, Development Center Coordinators and their spouses, traditional rulers, the clergy, traditional birth attendants (TBAs) and other care givers to create awareness and sensitize the public about the unacceptable maternal mortality and morbidities in the State, as well as proffer ways of reducing the scourge.
The workshop which kick-started with a Safe Motherhood Walk at the State capital led by Elechi, accompanied by the Deputy Governor and his wife and other Ebonyi men and women, ran simultaneously in the State Capital and 13 LGAs of the State. There was also a pre-workshop symposium organized by MCCI with expert representatives from the Federal Ministries of Health and Education as well as UNICEF. Other key stakeholders in the State Ministries of Education and Health also participated. There were three interactive sessions after the workshop and the third session had the Permanent Secretary, Federal Ministry of Health in attendance. The conceptual document of MCCI was further ventilated during the sessions as well as ways of strengthening the relevant ministries of Health and Education.
To effectively facilitate the reduction of maternal mortality in the State, a Bill on Mother and Child Initiative and Related Matters capturing maternal mortality monitoring, was sponsored to the State House of Assembly by Elechi. The aim is to, among others, have a law in the State that will make maternal death reportable and stipulates 10 hours duration for referral of pregnant women laboring in peripheral center. The Bill was eventually passed into Law on May 21, 2008 and assented to by the Governor on June 5, 2008. Full implementation of the Law was stepped down to 2009 after adequate sensitization, awareness creation and inauguration of the maternal mortality monitoring committees at the State, LGA and Ward levels, as well as the implementation of the Free Maternal Healthcare Program of the State Government.
A technical committee of the State Ministry of Health and MCCI undertook an evaluation of the state of healthcare facilities in the State to facilitate improvement in the delivery of healthcare services in the State.
MCCI undertook advocacy visits to the 13 LGAs to sensitize and mobilize the public so as to enhance community participation in MCCI thematic areas.
Having garnered the necessary support, the MCCI team set out to construct and equip a Vesico-Vaginal Fistula Center for the South-East zone to make Ebonyi a center of excellence in VVF management. This was done in collaboration with UNFPA.
With the Center being put in place, the team set out to identify and prepare VVF patients for the first ever VVF mass repair campaign in Southern Nigeria. The campaign took off on November 17, 2008 in collaboration with UNFPA, followed by the official commissioning of the center by the wife of the President and First Lady of the Federal Republic of Nigeria, Hajiya (Dr.) Turai Yar’Adua on December 5, 2008.
In collaboration with Acquire Project Fistula Care, a training on infection prevention and control was organized for the staff of the Fistula Center to equip them with modern concepts of infection prevention and hospital waste management, as well as universal safety precautions that would protect the provider and clients from acquiring hospital infections.
The 2009 program commenced with sensitization campaigns and awareness creation at the LGAs on the dangers of female genital cutting, teenage pregnancy, need for pregnant women to attend antenatal clinics and deliver in the hospital; girl-child education, constant self-examination for early detection of breast cancer, and need for annual screening for premalignant lesions of the cervix. Also, a lot of sensitization is ongoing on the maternal mortality law. The sensitization and awareness creation is through MCCI jingles with electronic media and also by the MCCE team led by Elechi that has been visiting the various communities and LGAs. This sensitization has become necessary because of the effects of these issues on maternal health.
A 2-day stakeholders forum was organized and attended by MCCI, the Federal Ministry of Health, USAID/Acquire Fistula Project and UNFPA. The forum was organized to explore areas of assistance by the Federal Ministry of Health and linkages by the South-East Regional VVF Center with other partners to ensure the Program's sustainability in terms of provision of free treatment for patients within the region and to ensure that the center receives annual financial assistance.
Elechi hosted a one-day Inaugural Forum of Wives of Governors of South-East and Benue States in collaboration with UNICEF to form an alliance for a shared vision on issues of women and children in the focal areas.
Radio and TV jingles have been produced in English and local languages to enhance publicity on the issues.
Other areas of concern and interest captured by MCCI include the Orphans and Vulnerable Children (OVCs) comprising orphans, street children, hawkers, those working at the quarry sites and rice mill. The initiative includes identification of all OVCs in the State and the development of an instrument for conducting a needs assessment after the identification exercise.
The Office of the Wife of the Governor, through the Free Mobile Clinic program is currently engaged in a Statewide free mobile health care exercise, where health care delivery is carried down to the communities in the various LGAs and Development Centers.
During such exercises, deworming exercises are performed on school children to enhance their intelligence status.

Elechi recently gave a presentation at the international Women Deliver conference in Washington DC on June 7–9, 2010. The theme of the conference was Delivering Solutions for Girls and Women.

The conference was organized by Women Deliver, a global advocacy organization bringing together voices from around the world to call for action against maternal death. Sponsorship and support for the conference was provided by a host of governmental and non-governmental organizations, including The World Bank, WHO, UNICEF, USAID, UNFPA, UNAIDS, The European Union, the Bill and Melinda Gates Foundation, and many others.

Conference attendees included First Ladies from various countries, representatives of various countries and NGOs, and medical experts in the field of obstetric and fistula care.

Mrs. Elechi was the lead speaker in a conference session on June 9, 2010 titled, "Innovations in Fistula Prevention, Treatment, and Reintegration." In her presentation, she described efforts to combat vesico-vaginal fistula (VVF) in Ebonyi State through a combination of legislation, enlightenment, prevention and treatment. ...

Media 
Elechi "championed advocacy on the passage of the Mother and child care initiative (MCCI) and related matters law" as reported in March 2010.

References

External links 
 Ebonyi Online - Mrs. Josephine Elechi

People from Ebonyi State
Living people
Igbo politicians
Year of birth missing (living people)